Republic Bharat or R. Bharat is a free-to-air Indian Hindi-language news affiliation of Republic TV, launched on 2 February 2019. Arnab Goswami is the owner and editor-in-chief of Republic Bharat. It is also available on DD Free Dish. It is a sister channel of Republic World which broadcasts news primarily in English.

History 
Republic Bharat was officially launched on 2 February 2019 with slogan 'Rashtra Ke Naam'.

As of 2 October 2020, according to the Broadcast Audience Research Council, Republic Bharat has the highest TV viewership among all Hindi news channels of India with 206861K weekly impressions.

Genre 
Soon after the launch of the channel, the Telecom Regulatory Authority of India (TRAI) received three complaints against the channel alleging that the channel was violating TRAI's broadcast sector regulations. The complaint was filed by TV Today network which owns Aaj Tak, India TV and TV18. According to the complaint, Republic Bharat had declared its genre as Hindi news, but it was being added in additional genres. This was seen as a deliberate attempt to illegally garner higher Broadcast Audience Research Council ratings and increase viewership.

TRP scam

In 2020, Mumbai Police initiated an investigation into the TRP manipulation scam of the channel after a complaint was filed that some channels were fraudulently inflating their viewership ratings. The police conducted an audit into the accounts of the ARG Outlier Media Pvt Ltd accounts. It showed that the TRPs (TV rating points) and viewership of Republic Bharat, were high from the first month of its launch in 2016. With an inflated TRP ARG Outlier Media (the company which owns Republic World and Republic Bharat) was able to bargain for higher revenue from advertisers.

In October 2020, upon receiving a complaint accusing some channels of fraudulently inflating their viewership ratings, Mumbai Police launched an investigation into Republic World's viewership ratings. The police allege that the channel inflated its ratings by bribing low-income individuals, including people who did not comprehend English, to keep their televisions tuned to Republic World; logs of WhatsApp chats between Goswami and the former chief executive of Broadcast Audience Research Council (the agency responsible for measuring TRP) were published to provide further evidence of collusion. The inflated TRP was leveraged to bargain for higher revenues from advertisers.

Goswami denies the allegations and has accused the Mumbai Police of retaliating against the channel's recent criticism of their activities. On 21 October, Central Bureau of Investigation got involved in the investigation, with the case now potentially covering every news channel in India. On 13 December, Republic World CEO was arrested in Mumbai, before being granted bail.

Ofcom censure 
In December 2020, the channel was fined 20,000 pounds (approximately 19.73 lakh INR) by the Office of Communications (Ofcom) for broadcasting content involving "offensive language", "hate speech" and "abusive or derogatory treatment of individuals, groups, religions or communities". It was also asked to air a public apology. Between 26 February and 9 April, the channel broadcast an apology in Hindi as well as English multiple times, throughout the day.

Rumours on China coup 
On 25 September 2022, Republic TV used a sarcastic thread of German reporter Georg Fahrion to report on a "political coup" on Chinese Communist Party general secretary Xi Jinping in their news report as "First and Exclusive News" and Breaking News. The reports were taken down from Republic World's Youtube channel but got viral circulating on Twitter. Fahrion when informed that his sarcastic thread was picked up and published as real news by Republic TV, he replied, "Since an Indian TV channel is now "reporting" on this thread, let me repeat: Two things are infinite, the universe and man's stupidity."

Availability

India 
Republic Bharat was launched in India on 2 February 2019 through various satellite and cable platforms.

United Kingdom 
Republic Bharat launched in the United Kingdom through the Sky platform on August 15. It has a separate UK beam with locally curated programs and events.

References

External links
 

24-hour television news channels in India
Television channels and stations established in 2019
Hindi-language television channels in India
Hindi-language television stations
Republic Media Network